Jay Anthony "Jaybird" Dobyns (born July 24, 1961), is a retired Special Agent and veteran undercover operative with the United States Bureau of Alcohol, Tobacco, Firearms and Explosives (ATF), New York Times Best-Selling author, public speaker, and high school football coach.

Early life 

Dobyns was born in Hammond, Indiana in 1961, but was raised in Tucson, Arizona. He was a standout athlete in several sports at Sahuaro High School before attending the University of Arizona to play football. He became an All-Pacific-10 conference wide receiver, College Football All-American Candidate at Wide Receiver and was named to Arizona Wildcats "All-Century" football team.  In 2012, Dobyns was named the "#1 Badass Arizona football player in history" by the Tucson Citizen newspaper. Dobyns graduated in 1985 with a bachelor's degree in public administration. He is a member of the Sahuaro High School and Pima County Sports Hall of Fame. After college, he played briefly in the Canadian Football League (1985) and United States Football League (1986) before deciding to become a federal law enforcement agent.

Federal law enforcement career 

Dobyns became a Special Agent with the Bureau of Alcohol, Tobacco and Firearms (ATF) in 1987.  Less than a week after beginning operational duty, he was taken hostage at gunpoint in the Tucson desert while serving an arrest warrant on a convicted felon who was recently released from prison. The suspect forced Dobyns into the driver seat of the officers' undercover car, which was immediately surrounded by the other agents with guns drawn. During a brief standoff, the agitated gunman repeatedly screamed at Dobyns to drive away. When Dobyns intentionally pulled the car keys from the ignition and dropped them to the floor, the assailant fired a single .38 caliber pistol bullet into Dobyns' lung, which exited his upper chest.  The other ATF agents instantly opened fire from both sides of the car, killing the gunman. Critically wounded, Dobyns was rushed to a Tucson hospital, where Dr. Richard Carmona, who later became the 17th United States Surgeon General, performed emergency trauma surgery that saved Dobyns' life.

Despite the severity of his wounds, Dobyns refused disability retirement and returned to duty within months of the shooting.  For the next two decades, he conducted over 500 undercover operations, developing expertise in violent crime investigations, weapons and narcotics trafficking, gang infiltrations, home invasion burglary and murder-for-hire cases. He also served as an instructor at ATF's National Academy and member of the Bureau's Enhanced Undercover Program.  He was repeatedly detailed to high-profile criminal and terrorism events including the "Rodney King" riots in Los Angeles, California, the Branch Davidian standoff in Waco, Texas, the Columbine High School massacre in Littleton, Colorado, and the Murrah Federal Building bombing in Oklahoma City, Oklahoma.

Hells Angels infiltration: "Operation Black Biscuit" 

In April 2002, a deadly altercation broke out between the Hells Angels Motorcycle Club and their arch-rivals, the Mongols Motorcycle Club in the middle of a Laughlin, Nevada casino filled with innocent bystanders, prompting federal law enforcement to open an undercover investigation called "Operation Black Biscuit", which included Dobyns.

Over nearly two years of undercover operations, Dobyns and a team of ATF agents, technicians and confidential informants infiltrated the Hells Angels, primarily in Arizona.  Dobyns posed as a gunrunner and member of the Solo Angels Motorcycle Club interested in joining the Angels. To earn his "patch" (full membership into the club) and further establish his credibility as a potential member ("Prospect") with the club's leadership, Dobyns staged the fake "murder" of a member of the rival Mongols. A law enforcement officer posing as the Mongols biker was splattered with lamb blood and brains, photographed and videotaped lying in a shallow grave. Dobyns had a bloodstained Mongols' "cut" (leather biker vest with club patches) mailed to the Hells Angels from somewhere in Mexico, and provided a videotape and pictures of the "killing".  According to Dobyns and ATF, the Hells Angels leadership was highly impressed and immediately voted Dobyns in as a full "patched" member of the club. Although awarded his Hells Angels vest by the leadership of the Skull Valley chapter, the club, including its legendary founder, Ralph "Sonny" Barger, have vehemently denied that Dobyns was ever "patched-in" Barger's denial is supported by Dobyns’ book, No Angel, in which Dobyns states that the vest that was draped over his back belonged to another member and that full Hells Angels membership required approval from the entire organization, which they were unlikely to get at that point.

Although the "Black Biscuit" investigation was deemed "successful" by ATF and yielded numerous criminal indictments for Racketeer Influenced and Corrupt Organizations Act (RICO) violations and other felony charges, internal government disagreement ultimately led to some of the primary defendants receiving reduced sentences or having their charges dismissed.

Decorations and awards 

Dobyns has received the United States Attorney General's Medal of Valor, twelve ATF Special Act Awards, two ATF Gold Stars for critical injuries received during investigative operations, an ATF Distinguished Service Medal for outstanding investigative accomplishment, the ATF Academy's Eddie Benetez award honoring exceptional physical fitness, the International Narcotics Officers Association Medal of Valor, the National Association of Police Officers “Top Cop” Award, the International Outlaw Motorcycle Gang Investigators Association Undercover Achievement Award, and the Australian Law Enforcement Practitioners Significant Infiltration Award.

Death threats and lawsuit 

In 2004, following the exposure of his true identity during the "Black Biscuit" prosecutions, Dobyns and his family became the targets of death threats by various organizations, including members and associates of the Hells Angels, Aryan Brotherhood and MS-13. According to Dobyns and official investigative reports by government watchdog agencies, ATF management failed to take reasonable measures to protect Dobyns and his family from numerous validated threats, including gang plans to infect Dobyns with the HIV virus, videotape the gang rape of his wife and daughter, kidnap his son and otherwise torture and murder them all.

ATF management unmasked/withdrew the Dobyns family's "backstopping" (protective countermeasures; residence address, untraceable drivers licenses and vehicle registrations, etc.) claiming that the backstop measures were no longer justified.  Dobyns alleged that this was done illegally and in retaliation for his whistleblowing on ATF's failure to assist in protecting undercover agents.

In August 2008, four months after ATF forced the location of his home into the public domain, his Tucson residence was the target of a late night arson attack while his wife and two children were asleep inside.  They escaped with only smoke inhalation injuries, but the ensuing fire destroyed the home and most of the family's belongings.

ATF executives insisted that focus be placed on Dobyns as the primary suspect in the arson of his own home in spite of investigators conclusions otherwise and credible evidence indicating the involvement of other known suspects. Dobyns filed multiple lawsuits winning a trial court victory and proving his allegations in 2014. That verdict is under review by the United States Supreme Court.. The Supreme Court judgment is here: https://www.supremecourt.gov/DocketPDF/19/19-389/116706/20190923155728720_Jay%20Dobyns%20v%20United%20States%20-%20Certiorari%20Petition.pdf

United States Court Of Federal Claims Judge Francis Allegra 54-page verdict laid blame on ATF for retaliation and endangerment for the Bureau's failed attempts to frame Dobyns.  Allegra ruled that ATF was corrupt in attempting to cover up its conduct by withholding evidence and using perjured testimony.  Allegra wrote in his final opinion: ""The United States wins its point whenever justice is done its citizens in the courts.” ...words now carved into the office rotunda of the Attorney General.  Presumably, what holds true for the citizenry in general ought to hold true for Federal agents who risk their lives in law enforcement. But if that is so, how does one explain this case?  Unfortunately, how certain ATF officials acted in the aftermath of the [Dobyns] Settlement Agreement bears little resemblance to the lofty sayings carved into the facades of the Department of Justice.  Experiences like these unfortunately bring to mind those that Agent Dobyns experienced in the years following the execution of the Settlement Agreement – a time that should have been one of healing and reconciliation, but that instead gave certain ATF officials and agents the opportunity to harm Agent Dobyns further. In the court's view, the actions of these ATF employees indisputably breached the covenant of good faith and fair dealing.""

The Office of the Inspector General and the United States Office of Special Counsel concluded that, ""ATF needlessly and inappropriately delayed its response to, and investigation of, threats against its own agent.""

Notoriety

Bestselling author 

In February 2009, Dobyns became a New York Times bestselling author following the release of his book, No Angel – My Harrowing Undercover Journey to the Inner Circle of the Hells Angels. The book chronicles the Hells Angels investigation and how it impacted his life and career.

Dobyns' Hells Angels exploits are also memorialized in the books Angels of Death, by Julian Sher and William Marsden, and Running with the Devil, by Kerrie Droban.

In 2017, Dobyns published his prequel/sequel story to No Angel, titled Catching Hell – A True Story of Abandonment and Betrayal.

Film and television 

Dobyns has been featured in television documentaries produced by The History Channel, including "Gangland: Behind Enemy Lines", "America's Book of Secrets", the National Geographic Channel's "Inside: Outlaw Bikers – Hells Angels", Fox Television's " America's Most Wanted", and Investigation Discovery's "Deadly Devotions" detailing his involvement in an investigation of a murder committed by the Hells Angels. In 2015 Dobyns appeared in six episodes of the television series "Outlaw Chronicles", and, 2016, he was featured as the pilot episode of the program "Deep Undercover" (Operation Black Biscuit: Infiltrating The Hells Angels) and two additional episodes detailing undercover investigations he participated in (Operation Nevada Volenteers: Sin City Bomber/Operation Rooster: Aryan Brotherhood).

Dobyns has appeared in several feature films, most notably alongside actors Gerard Butler, O'Shea Jackson, Pablo Schreiber and Eric Braeden in the film Den of Thieves. Dobyns' physical appearance has also served as inspiration for actors in films, including Barry Pepper in Snitch and Joe Manganiello in Sabotage.

Dobyns has appeared on national news programs such as Anderson Cooper 360 (CNN), Fox News, The FOX Report with Shepard Smith (FOX), and many others, discussing the death threats he has received, the federal government's failures related to those situations, and his status as a whistleblower.  He has also been featured in Newsweek Magazine, The Washington Post, The Wall Street Journal, and on National Public Radio.

Dobyns hosts a podcast titled Copland, promoting heroic stories of those in law enforcement, fire services and the military.

Current activities 

Dobyns retired in January 2014. He owns and operates the Jay Dobyns Group, focused on law enforcement training.

Dobyns coached youth sports for twenty-five years including three years (2020 to 2022) as the Head Football Coach at Tanque Verde High School.  Upon his resignation, the Coach Of The Year award was named after Dobyns.

Notes

References 
1. ^ "HHS – Vice Admiral Richard H. Carmona, M.D., M.P.H., F.A.C.S., Surgeon General". Hhs.gov. 2003-11-10. Retrieved 2011-10-10.
2. ^ a b "Biography & C.V". Jay Dobyns. Retrieved 2011-10-10.
3. ^ a b "Julian Sher.com". Julian Sher.com. Retrieved 2011-10-10.
4. ^ "CNN.com, Federal agent penetrated Hells Angels, fears for his life, February 6, 2007". Cnn.com. 2007-02-05. Retrieved 2011-10-10.
5. ^ Wagner, Dennis (2008-08-17). "Officials mum about fire at ATF Agent's home, August 17, 2008". Azcentral.com. Retrieved 2011-10-10.
6. ^ http://roadwaytocollege.com/go/page.pl/000000A/http/www.osc.gov/FY2009/Scanned/09-19=2520DI-07-0367/09-19=2520DI-07-0367=2520Ltr=2520to=2520President.pdf
7. ^ "FY 2009 Public File". Osc.gov. Retrieved 2011-10-10.
8. ^ "The FOX Report With Shepard Smith – Wednesday, Jul 01, 2009 – mReplay Livedash TV Transcript – Livedash – Search what is being mentioned across national TV". Livedash. Retrieved 2011-10-10.
9. ^ "Federal agent penetrated Hells Angels, fears for his life – CNN". Articles.cnn.com. 2007-02-05. Retrieved 2011-10-10.
10. ^ Eve Conant (2009-03-06). "A Very Hellish Journey – The Daily Beast". Newsweek.com. Retrieved 2011-10-10.
11. ^ "Still Catching Hell: Undercover No More, Jay Dobyns Revs Up for a New Fight". Washingtonpost.com. Retrieved 2011-10-10.
12. ^ Trachtenberg, Jeffrey A. (2009-03-04). "'No Angel' Author's Undercover Mission – WSJ.com". Online.wsj.com. Retrieved 2011-10-10.
13. ^ "Monday, June 8, 2009 | The Diane Rehm Show from WAMU and NPR". The Diane Rehm Show. 2009-06-08. Retrieved 2011-10-10.
14. ^ "Random House / Crown Publishing Group". Randomhouse.com. Retrieved 2011-10-10.
15. ^ "The New York Times Best Seller List, March 8, 2009" (PDF). Retrieved 2011-10-10.
16. ^ "Jay Dobyns Group, LLC". Jaydobyns.com. Retrieved 2011-10-10.
17. ^ "Running With the Devil". Kerrie Droban. Retrieved 2011-10-10.
18. ^ The History Club Membership. "Gangland Behind Enemy Lines DVD – History Store". Shop.history.com. Retrieved 2011-10-10.
19. ^ USA. "National Geographic Channel". Channel.nationalgeographic.com. Retrieved 2011-10-10.
20. ^ 
21. ^ "SHS Cougar Foundation Hall of Fame". Sahuaro78.com. Retrieved 2011-10-10.
22. ^ "Pima County Sports Hall of Fame Inductees". Pcshf.org. Retrieved 2011-10-10.
23. ^ https://web.archive.org/web/20061014120152/http://www.frankserpico.com/
24. ^ "FBI – Using Intel to Stop the Mob – Agent Pistone". Fbi.gov. 1981-07-26. Retrieved 2011-10-10.
25. ^ Griffin, Dennis. "Covert: My Years Infiltrating the Mob (9781402754432): Bob Delaney, Dave Scheiber, Bill Walton: Books". Amazon.com. Retrieved 2011-10-10.
26. ^ "William Queen". Menstuff.org. 2006-12-24. Retrieved 2011-10-10.
27. ^ "60 Minutes: FBI Wiseguy Fooled The Mob". CBS News. Retrieved 2011-10-10.

External links 
 The Arizona Republic, The Arizona Republic, Officials mum about fire at ATF agent's home, Aug. 17, 2008
 Jay Dobyns – Official Website

1961 births
Living people
ATF agents
Arizona Wildcats football players
University of Arizona alumni
Sahuaro High School alumni
Hells Angels